Henri Jan Wienese (born 4 June 1942) is a former Dutch competition rower. He won the gold medal in single sculls at the 1968 Summer Olympics in Mexico City, the only gold medal ever for the Netherlands in this event. He also won two European bronze medals in single sculls in 1965 and 1967, as well as a silver at the 1966 World Rowing Championships.

Through his sister Jetty Baars-Wienese, a former Dutch tennis champion, Wienese is the great-uncle of French former basketball player, Tony Parker.

References

External links
 

1942 births
Living people
Dutch male rowers
Medalists at the 1968 Summer Olympics
Olympic gold medalists for the Netherlands
Olympic medalists in rowing
Olympic rowers of the Netherlands
Rowers at the 1968 Summer Olympics
Rowers from Amsterdam
World Rowing Championships medalists for the Netherlands
European Rowing Championships medalists
20th-century Dutch people